Thyrgis childon is a moth in the subfamily Arctiinae. It was described by Herbert Druce in 1885. It is found in Ecuador and Colombia.

Subspecies
Thyrgis childon childon (Ecuador)
Thyrgis childon colombiana Hering, 1925 (Colombia)

References

Moths described in 1885
Arctiinae